MotoGP: Ultimate Racing Technology 2 is a Grand Prix motorcycle racing video game developed by Climax Brighton for the Xbox, Microsoft Windows, and mobile phones. It was the second title in THQ's MotoGP series and based on the 2002 Grand Prix motorcycle racing season. Players can take part in a single race on three choosable circuits Suzuka, Phakisa, Jerez or participate in a full season, eventually unlocking more circuits to be raced on. Players could ride as most of the MotoGP riders from 2002, except for a couple of riders including Valentino Rossi, Max Biaggi and a few other riders. They are unlocked by achieving a specific number of points in Stunt Mode. Stunt mode is when the player races a one lap race performing different stunts as wheelies, burnouts and powerslides for points. Points are also rewarded when overtaking another rider, driving clean sections, or ramming other riders so they crash. However, recently gained points are lost if the player drives outside the track or crashes. Also if the player fails to reach goal within the timelimit, all rewarded points are lost.

Reception

The Xbox and PC versions received "favorable" reviews according to the review aggregation website Metacritic. GameSpot named it the best Xbox game of June 2003.

References

External links
 

2003 video games
Mobile games
Grand Prix motorcycle racing video games
Racing video games
THQ games
Video games developed in the United Kingdom
Windows games
Xbox games
Grand Prix motorcycle racing